Zona Río (English: "River Zone") is an official zone, and the main modern business district, of the city of Tijuana, Mexico.

The Río Zone is within the Delegación Centro, or Central borough, of Tijuana. The old downtown of Tijuana, Zona Centro, borders Zona Río on the west.

The Zona Río is home to most of the regional headquarters for commercial and financial businesses and health services. The city's largest mall, Plaza Río Tijuana, the central market, and the majority of Tijuana's larger hotels and upscale restaurants are also located here, along Zona Río's three main avenues, Paseo de los Héroes, Avenida Padre Kino and Boulevard General Rodolfo Sánchez Taboada. As such, the area can be considered an edge city.

Although being comparatively small in comparison with other Mexican cities main business districts, such as those of Monterrey and Guadalajara, Zona Río has notable skyscrapers, which due to the relative distance between them, are very prominent. The tallest buildings are the 28-story twin towers that are home for the Plaza Aguacaliente and Grand Hotel Tijuana, commonly known by locals as Las Torres or The Towers.

Name

Zona Río literally translates into English as River Zone. This name is owed to the nearly dried Tijuana River, which divides Zona Río. The river is crossed by many bridges to allow traffic between the west side of Zona Río, located at the west-center of the city, and the east of Zona Rio, located in the east-center of Tijuana.

Principal thoroughfares

Paseo de los Héroes
One of the most important avenues in the whole city of Tijuana is the Paseo de los Héroes (lit. "Road of the Heroes"). Along this avenue are located most of the financial, commercial, and touristic businesses of Zona Río and the entire city. Insurance companies, numerous banks, such as BBVA-Bancomer and  Banamex, and shopping squares, such as Plaza Río Tijuana, the largest mall in the city, have their headquarters in this avenue. The cultural heart-point of the city, the Tijuana Cultural Center, is on Paseo de los Héroes. Two recently built skyscrapers are exclusively occupied by two different hospitals and its corporations. Most of the high-end hotels of the entire city are located in Paseo de los Héroes avenue.

Paseo de los Héroes is also noted for its many monuments and sculptures, like the Monumento a la Raza (Spanish for Monument to the Race), the Abraham Lincoln statue, the Ignacio Zaragoza statue, the Cuauhtémoc statue, the Lázaro Cárdenas statue, and others, to which the avenue largely owes its name, Road of the Heroes.

Tijuana CowParade 2008
During June 2008, Tijuana was hosting the CowParade. Along with the also popular Avenida Revolución, Paseo de los Héroes holds many of the artistic cows, in such popular places like the Monumento a la Raza and the Tijuana Cultural Center.

Boulevard Sánchez Taboada
In contrast to Paseo de los Héroes or Aguas Calientes, this is not one of the main avenues of the whole city, but rather only of Zona Río.

This avenue is the main gastronomical corridor of Zona Río, offering the widest variety of gastronomy in the entire city. There are restaurants offering food from Thailand, Mongolia, Greece, Brazil or Israel, not to mention the typical Italian, Spanish, French, Argentinian, Chinese and American foods, plus the widespread Japanese sushi. As regards of Mexican food, the common tacos, Baja California-seafood, and the antojitos (Spanish term for traditional Mexican snacks or tapas), they are found almost everywhere in the avenue.

Boulevard Agua Caliente

This is one of the most important and largest avenues in the city, together with Paseo de los Héroes, with both crossing nearly the entire city. Prior to the opening of Tijuana's new airport at Otay district in 1958, the city's former airport was located along present-day Blvd. Agua Caliente.

Also one of the main gastronomical corridors in the city, and a touristic and commercial avenue, Blvd. Agua Caliente may be a combination of both Paseo de los Héroes and Blvd. Sanchez Taboada, but with a characteristic of being the place where sports auditoriums and stadiums are located.

The Agua Caliente Hippodrome and Racetrack is located here. The Municipal Auditorium of Tijuana, home of both of Tijuana's basketball teams, and the Estadio Casas GeoCaliente Stadium, home of the city's newly formed soccer team.

The tallest buildings of Tijuana, Las Torres (officially Plaza Agua Caliente & Grand Hotel Tijuana), are located here, along some other buildings and public hospitals.

Paseo del Centenario
Paseo del Centenario ("Centennial Avenue") is also another important avenue within the area. The Municipal Palace of Tijuana is located here, along with the State Government Center of Tijuana.

New City Residential is located here, as well as the Tijuana General Hospital and many other notable buildings.

Notable landmarks and places of interest

 Municipal Palace of Tijuana
 Tijuana Cultural Center
 Agua Caliente Casino and Hotel National Heritage Site
 Estadio Caliente and Caliente Hippodrome
 Plaza Rio Shopping Mall

Buildings and skyscrapers

Las Torres (Plaza Agua Caliente & Grand Hotel Tijuana)
Green View Tower
ING Comercial America Building
Centro Médico Excel
Hospital Angeles Tijuana
Torre Platino
Centura Tower
Camino Real Hotel
New City Residential
Edificio GILT
Centro de Control y Mando de Tijuana
Edificio Ventura
Torre Bellavista
Torre MOL
VIA Corporativo
Hospital General de Tijuana
Torre Zentrum
FRISA Building
Wadiah Building
Rodeo Building

Gallery

See also

 Downtown San Diego

References

External links

Neighborhoods in Tijuana
Edge cities in Mexico